Ovidiu Hanganu (born 12 May 1970) is a retired Romanian football striker, who played for Corvinul Hunedoara, Victoria București, Dinamo București, Naţional București, abroad Cercle Brugge and Samsunspor. He earned 12 caps for Romania, scoring two goals.

Career statistics
Total matches played in Romanian First League: 199 matches – 67 goals.
European Cups: 5 matches – 0 goal.
Topscorer of Romanian First League: 1990–91.
Olympic team: 3 matches – 1 goal
Under 21 team: 17 goals – 1 goal

References

External links

1970 births
Living people
Romanian footballers
Romania international footballers
Romanian expatriate footballers
CS Corvinul Hunedoara players
FC Dinamo București players
FC Progresul București players
Cercle Brugge K.S.V. players
Samsunspor footballers
Expatriate footballers in Belgium
Expatriate footballers in Turkey
Romanian expatriate sportspeople in Belgium
Romanian expatriate sportspeople in Turkey
Belgian Pro League players
Liga I players
Liga II players
Süper Lig players
Association football forwards
People from Hunedoara County